Calysta is a multinational biotechnology firm based in San Mateo, California. The company develops industrial processes that utilize microorganisms to convert methane into protein for seafood,  livestock feed and other food ingredients. It operates a demonstration plant in Teesside, England, that uses methanotroph bacteria to convert methane into single cell protein currently approved for use in fish and livestock feed in the European Union. The firm is a spinout of DNA 2.0, the largest US-based provider of synthetic genes for industrial and academic use.

History 
Calysta was founded in 2012 in Menlo Park, California by Josh Silverman, and is led by CEO Alan Shaw.

By June 2013, the firm began working with NatureWorks to use methane fermentation to produce lactic acid. However, its main technology is based on a similar method developed in the 1980s by Statoil, an unrelated and state-owned energy company in Norway. In 2014, Calysta purchased and further developed the technology for producing animal feed ingredients. Using the ten-million-dollar total funding from investors including Aqua-Spark, Calysta began a  study to determine the viability of a mass production facility.

In January 2016, the firm began building its pilot facility in Teesside, England. The center was developed with a supplemental grant of £2.8 million ($3.7 million) from the UK Government. In early 2016, the firm announced it had raised $30 million in funding led by Cargill, an American agribusiness corporation.

The firm's Teesside facility opened in September 2016. The facility is dedicated to the production of the company's chief product, "FeedKind protein." The firm raised an additional $40 million in May 2017 from existing  and new investors including Japan's Mitsui & Co. and Singapore's Temasek Holdings. The firm recently completed its first commercial scale production facility in Chongqing, China with a capacity of 20,000 tonnes of product per year.

Operations 
Calysta's processes rely on methanotrophs (specifically Methylococcus capsulatus) which naturally convert methane into methanol by the enzyme, methane monooxygenase.  Calysta is producing an alternative yet non-genetically modified protein for use in commercial feed. Protein produced from methane is being offered as a substitute or supplement in the farmed fish industry which conventionally employs fishmeal and fish oil as its source of protein.

Currently, the company's manufacturing facilities use natural gas as their source of methane. In addition to its facilities in Europe, the firm's first manufacturing facility in the United States is due to open by 2019.It is expected to produce an estimated 20,000 metric tons per year when operational and 200,000 metric tons per year when at full capacity.

References

External links 
 
2012 establishments in California
Privately held companies based in California
Agriculture companies of the United States
Companies based in Menlo Park, California
Technology companies based in the San Francisco Bay Area
Biotechnology companies established in 2012